Crambin is a small seed storage protein from the Abyssinian cabbage. It belongs to thionins. It has 46 residues (amino acids). It has been extensively studied by X-ray crystallography since its crystals are unique and diffract to a resolution of 0.48 Å. Neutron scattering measurements are available also at a resolution of 1.1 Å.

References 

Proteins